The Satellite Award for Best Animated or Mixed Media Feature is an annual Satellite Award given by the International Press Academy.

Winners and nominees

1990s

2000s

2010s

2020s

Directors with multiple wins
2 wins
Wes Anderson
Brad Bird
John Lasseter
Hayao Miyazaki
Tomm Moore
Lee Unkrich

References

External links
 Official website

Animated or Mixed Media Feature
Awards for best animated feature film
Awards established in 1996